Fairfield Municipal Airport  is a city-owned, public-use airport located two nautical miles (3.7 km) west of the central business district of Fairfield, in Wayne County, Illinois. According to the FAA's National Plan of Integrated Airport Systems for 2009 to 2013, it was classified as a general aviation airport.

Although most U.S. airports use the same three-letter location identifier for the FAA and IATA, this airport is assigned FWC by the FAA but has no designation from the IATA.

Facilities and aircraft 
It has two asphalt paved runways: 9/27 is 4,000 by 75 feet (1,219 x 23 m) and 18/36 is 1,999 by 60 feet (609 x 18 m). 

The airport has an FBO. Fuel is available, as are a lounge, restrooms, weather planning stations, and a courtesy car. 

For the 12-month period ending June 30, 2019, the airport had 8,000 aircraft operations, an average of 22 per day: 94% general aviation and 6% air taxi. For the same time period, there were 14 airplanes based on the field: 13 single-engine and 1 multi-engine.

References

External links 
 Aerial photo as of 12 April 1998 from USGS The National Map
 

Airports in Illinois
Buildings and structures in Wayne County, Illinois
Transportation in Illinois
Transportation in Wayne County, Illinois